Mina Nouri (born on 6 January 1951) is an Iranian painter, printmaker and educator.

Biography 
Mina Nouri was born on 6 January 1951 in Tehran, Iran. She is married to photographer Ahmad Aali. 

Between 1970–1975, she studied at Accademia di Belle Arti di Roma, as well as at Accademia di Albertina, Torino and Istituto Statale d'Arte Urbino. From 1975 until 1996, she was a member of faculty at Farabi University and at University of Art, Tehran, Iran.

Publications
A Practical Study of Serigraphy (Silk screen), 2006 Fourth Edition, 2001 Third Edition, 1992 Second Edition, 1981 First Edition
Printmaking, The Chalcography Technique, 1995 First Edition.
Printmaking, The Chalcography Technique, 2011 2nd Edition.
The Etchings of Mina Nouri, 2002 First Edition.

Translations
Genesi della forma written by Mario Arnaboldi and Enrico Garbagnati, Published by University of Art, 2001 Second Edition, 1994 First Edition, Tehran, Iran.

References 

1951 births
Living people
20th-century Iranian women artists
21st-century Iranian women artists
People from Tehran
Iranian women painters
Iranian printmakers
Women printmakers
Accademia di Belle Arti di Roma alumni